The 1899 Swarthmore Quakers football team was an American football team that represented Swarthmore College as an independent during the 1899 college football season. The team compiled an 8–1–2 record.  George H. Brooke was the head coach.

Schedule

References

Swarthmore
Swarthmore Garnet Tide football seasons
Swarthmore Quakers football